João Alberto Barone Reis e Silva, better known as João Barone (born August 5, 1962 in Rio de Janeiro), is a Brazilian drummer.

Since 1982 he is the drummer of the band Os Paralamas do Sucesso.

Discography

Guest appearances
Eduardo Dussek - Brega Chique (1984)
Léo Jaime - Sessão da Tarde (1985)
Léo Jaime - Vida Difícil (1986)
Ultraje a Rigor - Sexo!! (1987)
Ed Motta and Conexão Japeri - Ed Motta & Conexão Japeri (1988)
Kid Abelha - Kid (1989)
Jorge Ben Jor - Benjor (1989)
Theo Werneck - Leite Materno (1990)
Marina Lima - Marina Lima (1991)
Fausto Fawcett and Laufer - Básico Instinto (1993)
Dinho Ouro Preto - Vertigo (1994)
Rita Lee - Rita e Roberto (1995)
Titãs - Domingo (1995)
Paulo Ricardo - Rock Popular Brasileiro (1996)
Lenine - O Dia em Que Faremos Contato (1997)
Arnaldo Antunes - Um Som (1998)
George Israel - 4 Letras (2004)
Zé Ramalho - Parceria dos Viajantes (2007)

References 

1962 births
Brazilian drummers
Musicians from Rio de Janeiro (city)
Living people
Brazilian rock musicians